Element Solutions Inc is an American specialty chemicals production corporation listed on the New York Stock Exchange.

History
The corporation was founded in 2013 by Martin E. Franklin, with financial backing from Bill Ackman. The company manufactures and supplies specialty chemicals for consumer electronics, communication infrastructure, automobile, industrial surface finishing, consumer packaging and offshore oil production and drilling.

Additionally, the corporation purchased several highly complementary specialty chemicals companies from 2013 through 2015: MacDermid Incorporated in October 2013, the electronic chemicals and photomasks businesses of OM Group Inc. in October 2015, and Alent plc in December 2015.  After the final acquisition became effective, in 2016, Platform Specialty Products launched a new division in order to combine the operations of the acquired businesses.

In July, 2018, United Phosphorus Limited announced acquisition of Arysta Life Sciences, the Crop business of Platform Specialty Chemicals for a total sum of $4.2 billion, with the latter exiting the crop business entirely. In 2019, the company changed its name to Element Solutions Inc. from Platform Specialty Chemicals. It is now listed as ESI on the New York Stock Exchange.

References

Element Solutions Inc
Element Solutions Inc
Element Solutions Inc
Element Solutions Inc